The Aurie's Star Handicap is a Victoria Racing Club Group 3 horse race held under open handicap conditions, for horses aged three years old and upwards, over a distance of 1200 metres, held annually at Flemington Racecourse in Melbourne, Australia in August.  The total prize money is A$200,000.

History
The event is the first Group race in the new racing calendar in Victoria.

The race is named in honour of Auries's Star, a gelding who won 28 of his 89 starts, including the 1937 Newmarket Handicap, the 1937 and 1939 Oakleigh Plate as well as the 1940 Goodwood Handicap.

Grade
 1996–2004 - Unlisted handicap
 2005–2009 - Listed Race
 2010 onwards - Group 3

Venue
 1996–2006: Flemington Racecourse
 2007: Moonee Valley Racecourse
 2008 onwards: Flemington Racecourse

Winners

 2021 - The Astrologist
 2020 - Home Of The Brave
 2019 - So Si Bon
 2018 - Voodoo Lad
 2017 - Hey Doc
 2016 - Sooboog
 2015 - Shiraz
 2014 - Tiger Tees
 2013 - Broken
 2012 - Shanghai Warrior
 2011 - Temple Of Boom
 2010 - Elusive Touch
 2009 - Mic Mac
 2008 - Grand Duels
2007 - Monet Rules
2006 - Bel Danoro
2005 - Niconero
2004 - General Bayton
2003 - Sports
2002 - Fields Of Omagh
2001 - Sound The Alarm
2000 - Roktzar
1999 - Hula Wonder
1998 - Source of Divorce
1997 - Penghulu
1996 - Homestead

See also
 List of Australian Group races
 Group races

References

Horse races in Australia
Flemington Racecourse